Tarn  ( or) is a department in the Occitania region in Southern France. Named after the river Tarn, it had a population of 389,844 as of 2019. Its prefecture and largest city is Albi; it has a single subprefecture, Castres. In French, the inhabitants of Tarn are known as Tarnais (masculine) and Tarnaises (feminine). Its INSEE and postcode number is 81.

History
Tarn is one of the original 83 departments created during the French Revolution on 4 March 1790, through application of the Law of 22 December 1789. It was created from part of the former province of Languedoc, and comprised the dioceses of Albi and Castres (which found themselves merged in 1817).

The new department had five districts: Albi, Castres, Lavaur, Gaillac, Lacaune. The capitals (now prefectures) were, alternatively, Albi and Castres but, from 1790 to 1797, the capital was only Albi; in 1797, the capital was moved to Castres. In 1800, Albi became again the capital of the department and the arrondissements were created; the department had four arrondissements: Albi, Castres, Gaillac and Lavaur. In 1926, the arrondissements of Gaillac and Lavaur were eliminated.

By the law of 28 Pluviôse Year 5, the departments of Hérault and of Tarn exchanged the canton of Anglès (which had been part of the diocese of Saint-Pons, but which has remained in Tarn) for that of Saint-Gervais-sur-Mare (which had been part of the diocese of Castres, but which today remains in Hérault).

Geography 

The department is surrounded by 5 departments, all belonging to the region Occitanie: Hérault to the southeast, Aude to the south, Aveyron to the north and east, Haute-Garonne to the southwest and west, as well as Tarn-et-Garonne to the northwest. It is one of two French departments surrounded entirely by other departments of the same region.

The slope of the department is from east to west, and its general character is mountainous or hilly. Tarn's three principal ranges lying to the south-east are: the Mountains of Lacaune, the Sidobre and the Montagne Noire, belonging to the Cévennes.

The stony and wind-blown slopes of the Mountains of Lacaune (Monts de Lacaune) are used for pasture. The Montagne Noire, on the southwestern border of the department, derives its name from the forests on its northern slope.

The limestone and sandstone foot-hills are clothed with vines and fruit trees, and are broken by deep alluvial valleys of particular fertility. With the exception of a small portion of the Montagne Noire, which drains into the river Aude, the whole department belongs to the basin of the Garonne.

Demographics
Tarn has a population, in 2019, of 389,844, for a population density of  inhabitants/km2.

Population evolution
Population development since 1801:

Principal towns

The most populous commune is Albi, the prefecture. As of 2019, there are 10 communes with more than 6,000 inhabitants:

Administration

Administrative divisions
There are 2 arrondissements, 23 cantons and 314 communes in Tarn.

Politics

Departmental Council of Tarn
The Departmental Council of Tarn has 46 seats. In the 2015 departmental elections, the Socialist Party (PS) won 26 seats and The Republicans (LR) and Union of Democrats and Independents (UDI) alliance won 18 seats; two miscellaneous right candidates complete the assembly composition. Christophe Ramond (PS) has been President of the Departmental Council since 2017.

Members of the National Assembly
In the 2017 legislative election, Tarn elected the following members of the National Assembly:

Tourism

See also
Cantons of the Tarn department
Communes of the Tarn department
Arrondissements of the Tarn department
Tourism in Tarn

References

External links

 Departmental Council website 
 Prefecture website 
 Discover Tarn –  Comité Départemental du Tourisme du Tarn
 Photos of the Tarn 

 
1790 establishments in France
Departments of Occitania (administrative region)
States and territories established in 1790
Massif Central